Sæbø may refer to:

Places
Sæbø (municipality), a former municipality in Vestland county, Norway
Sæbø, Vestland, a village in Alver municipality, Vestland county, Norway
Sæbø Church, a church in Alver municipality, Vestland county, Norway
Sæbø, Møre og Romsdal, a village in Ørsta municipality, Møre og Romsdal county, Norway
Sæbø, Rogaland, a village in the Finnøy area of Stavanger municipality, Rogaland county, Norway

People
Lars Sæbø, a Norwegian trade unionist and politician for the Labour Party
Magne Sæbø (born 1929), a Norwegian biblical scholar specializing in the Old Testament

Other
Sæbø sword, a 9th-century Viking sword found in Vik, Norway